Deshabandhu Ajit Jayaratne is the former chairman of the Colombo Stock Exchange, the Finance Commission of Sri Lanka and of the Ceylon Chamber of Commerce.

Corporate experience
Ajit Jayaratne is currently the Chairman of KIA Motors and a director of Singer (Sri Lanka), Colombo Fort Land and Building PLC, Kotagala Plantations PLC, C.W. Mackie PLC and ACL Cables PLC. He is the former director of the Ceylon Petroleum Corporation, DFCC Bank, Associated Electrical Corporation Ltd, Delmege Forsyth Co., People's Bank and a former Chairman of Forbes and Walkers Ltd. and Apollo Hospitals.

Ajit Jayaratne recently launched Innovest Investments (Pvt) Ltd, a boutique investment management company. Jayaratne is a graduate of Economics from the University of Southampton and a Chartered Accountant by profession. A former High Commissioner to Singapore, Mr Jayaratne is also a fellow of the Institute of Chartered Accountants, UK and Sri Lanka.

References

Living people
Year of birth missing (living people)
Sinhalese businesspeople